First-seeded Helen Wills defeated Betty Nuthall 6–1, 6–4 in the final to win the women's singles tennis title at the 1927 U.S. National Championships. The event was held at the West Side Tennis Club, Forest Hills, New York City. It was Wills's fourth U.S. National singles title. She won the title without losing a set and lost only 18 games in six matches.

Draw

Final eight

References

1927
1927 in women's tennis
U.S. National Championships - Women's singles
Women's singles
1927 in New York City
1927 in sports in New York (state)
Women's sports in New York (state)